This is a list of numbered county roads in Lanark County, Ontario.  Connecting road segments (some not maintained by the County) are named in parentheses.

References 

Lanark